The Polish 1. Liga operates as the second level of ice hockey in Poland. The league lies below the Polska Hokej Liga.

Teams (2021–2022)
 Sokoly Torun
 UKS Niedzwiadki Sanok
 MMKS Podhale Nowy Targ
 SMS PZHL Katowice
 KS Katowice Naprzód Janów
 SMS Torun
 MOSM Tychy
 GKS Stoczniowiec Gdańsk
 KH Polonia Bytom
 UKS Zagłębie Sosnowiec
 UKH Unia Oswiecim
 Opole HK
 MKS Cracovia Krakow 
 ŁKH Łódź

Champions

References

External links
Polish Ice Hockey Federation

Pol
2